The Mediterranean Region is a geographical region of Turkey. The largest city in the region is Antalya. Other big cities are Adana, Mersin  and Kahramanmaraş.

It is bordered by the Aegean Region to the west, the Central Anatolia Region to the north, the Eastern Anatolia Region to the northeast, the Southeastern Anatolia Region to the east, Syria to the southeast, and the Mediterranean Sea to the south.

Subdivision 

 Adana Section
Çukurova - Taurus Mountains Area
Antakya - Kahramanmaraş Area
 Antalya Section
Antalya Area
Göller Area
Taşeli - Mut Area
Teke Area

Ecoregions

Terrestrial

Palearctic

Temperate grasslands, savannas, and shrublands 

 Central Anatolian steppe

Mediterranean forests, woodlands, and scrub 

 Anatolian conifer and deciduous mixed forests
 Eastern Mediterranean conifer-sclerophyllous-broadleaf forests                                 
 Southern Anatolian montane conifer and deciduous forests

Provinces 

Provinces that are entirely in the Mediterranean Region:
 Adana
 Antalya
Mersin
 Burdur
 Hatay
 Isparta
 Osmaniye

Provinces that are mostly in the Mediterranean Region:
 Kahramanmaraş

Provinces that are partially in the Mediterranean Region:
 Konya
 Niğde
 Kayseri
 Denizli
 Gaziantep
 Muğla
 Karaman
 Kilis

Geography 
Mediterranean Region is a mountainous region. Toros Mountains, a mountain chain from west to east, covers most of the region.  Another chain is Amonos Mountains which run from north to south in the extreme east of the region. The mountains run in parallel to sea and in most places the mountains meet the sea except in coastal plains. The coastal plains were formed in the lower courses of the rivers. The most important coastal plain is Çukurova (Cilicia of the antiquity) in the eastern part of the region. It was formed by three rivers, Berdan, Seyhan and Ceyhan. Main lakes of the region, like Lake Beyşehir, Lake Eğirdir and Lake Burdur which form a closed basin are in the north west of the region.

The capital of each province is a city bearing the name of the province except Antakya which is the capital city of Hatay Province.
 
However, as the provinces are the administrative units their border lines do not exactly match that of the region. Thus the region includes also the eastern part of Muğla Province as well as southern  parts of the neighbouring provinces like Konya Province, Karaman Province and Niğde Province. On the other hand, northern and eastern parts of Kahramanmaraş Province are not included in Mediterranean region.

Climate

The Mediterranean Region has a Mediterranean climate at the coast, with hot, dry summers and mild to cool, wet winters and a semi-arid continental climate in the interior with hot, dry summers and cold, snowy winters.

See also
Provinces of Turkey
Cilicia

Images

References

External links

 
Regions of Turkey
Mediterranean